Bear Grass Primitive Baptist Church is a historic Primitive Baptist church located on the north side NC 1001, 0.1 miles north of the junction with NC 1106 in Bear Grass, Martin County, North Carolina. It was built in 1877, and is a front-gable, two-bay frame building.  The building measures 42 feet, 2 3/4 inches, wide and 64 feet, 4 1/2 inches deep.  It rests on a brick pier foundation and it is believed that parts of the earlier building are incorporated into the current edifice.

It was added to the National Register of Historic Places in 2005.

References

Baptist churches in North Carolina
Churches on the National Register of Historic Places in North Carolina
Churches completed in 1877
19th-century Baptist churches in the United States
Churches in Martin County, North Carolina
National Register of Historic Places in Martin County, North Carolina
Primitive Baptists
1877 establishments in North Carolina